Timothy Charles Lewis (born 26 October 1967) is a British basketball coach. He is currently an Assistant Coach with responsibility for game plan review for the Minnesota Timberwolves  of the National Basketball Association. He was formerly the head coach for the Thailand men's national basketball team and Assistant coach to the Great Britain 2012 Olympic Team.

Coaching career

Early career
Lewis began coaching in 1990s before serving as Director of Coaching for the Sevenoaks Suns between 2004 and 2007. He then spent two years coaching the now-defunct Essex Pirates before spending the 2011–12 season as the Director of Basketball at the Sheffield Sharks.

Great Britain national teams
Between 2006 and 2012, Lewis served as the head coach of the Great Britain U20 national team and as an assistant with the Great Britain senior national team.

Return to professional basketball
In 2012–13, he was head coach of Weissenhorn Youngstars, and in 2013–14, he was head coach of the Hitachi Sunrockers. In June 2014, he was appointed an assistant coach for the Panama men's national basketball team.

Lewis spent the 2014–15 season as the lead assistant coach for the Bakersfield Jam of the NBA Development League.

On 28 July 2015 Lewis was named an assistant coach for Raptors 905.

Thailand national team
On 2016, Lewis was hired as the new Thailand men's national basketball team coach. His first experience as a head coach in international play was in the 2016 SEABA Cup, the Southeast Asian qualifying tournament for the 2016 FIBA Asia Challenge.

Philippines national team consultant
Lewis in 2017 worked with the staff of the Philippines men's national basketball teamthat will play at the 2017 Southeast Asian Games as a consultant.

Iowa Wolves (2021–2022)
On 26 October 2021, Lewis became an assistant coach for the Iowa Wolves of the NBA G League.

Head coach national team Qatar 
October 2018 fired and replaced

References

External links

1967 births
Living people
Bakersfield Jam coaches
Raptors 905 coaches
Sun Rockers Shibuya coaches